Indian Airlines Flight 403 was a scheduled domestic passenger flight from Begumpet Airport in Hyderabad to Bangalore. On 17 December 1978, the Boeing 737-2A8 crashed during takeoff, killing one passenger and causing three additional ground casualties.

Aircraft 
The aircraft involved was a Boeing 737-2A8 with serial number 20485 and construction number 277, registered as VT-EAL. The plane was seven years and ten months old at the time of the crash. It was powered by two Pratt & Whitney JT8D-9A turbojet engines.

Accident 
During takeoff from Runway 09 at Begumpet Airport, the aircraft entered a stall. The flight crew aborted the takeoff and attempted a wheels-up landing. The aircraft skidded , overshooting the runway and breaking the airport's perimeter fence before coming to a stop in flames. One passenger was killed, along with three more people who were cutting grass near the airport fence at the time of the accident.

Investigation 
Investigators determined that the leading edge devices were not extended during rotation due to a technical fault.

See also 

 China Northwest Airlines Flight 2119

References 

History of Telangana
Transport in Telangana
Aviation accidents and incidents in 1978
Aviation accidents and incidents in India
Accidents and incidents involving the Boeing 737 Original
Airliner accidents and incidents caused by mechanical failure